Bramley is a village and civil parish of the Metropolitan Borough of Rotherham in South Yorkshire, England.

Bramley is bordered by the urban development of Sunnyside conjoined to the village of Wickersley to the south, and the village of Ravenfield to the north. To the east, beyond Junction 1 of the M18, are the civil parishes of Hellaby (formerly part of Bramley) and Maltby.

Community
According to the 2001 census the parish had a population of 8,194.

There are no secondary schools in Bramley. Pupils aged 11–18 mostly attend nearby Wickersley School and Sports College which is situated in Wickersley on its border with Bramley. Other pupils also attend Maltby School or Thrybergh School, while others attend St Bernard's Catholic High School, Rotherham.

Buses through Bramley from Rotherham run to Maltby, Ravenfield, Mexborough, Hooton Levitt and Dinnington.

See also
Listed buildings in Bramley, Rotherham

References

External links 

 

Villages in South Yorkshire
Geography of the Metropolitan Borough of Rotherham
Civil parishes in South Yorkshire